Meriellum proteus is a species of beetle in the family Cerambycidae, the only species in the genus Meriellum.

References

Callidiini